Arthur Reginald Howe Francis (8 June 1882 – 15 June 1957), also known by the nickname of "Bolla", was a New Zealand dual-code international rugby union and rugby league footballer who played in the 1900s, 1910s and 1920s, and rugby union coach of the 1930s. He played representative level rugby union (RU) for New Zealand, Auckland, and at club level for Ponsonby RFC. He also played representative level rugby league (RL) for New Zealand and Australasia, as well as at club level for Wigan, as a forward (prior to the specialist positions of), during the era of contested scrums, and coached club level rugby union (RU) for Grammar RFC.

Early years
Francis was born in Wanganui, New Zealand. He was educated at Auckland Grammar.

Rugby union career
Francis played club rugby union for Ponsonby RFC, and was part of successive Auckland Rugby Union championships between 1908 and 1910. Francis made his Auckland début in 1904 and scored a penalty in the 1905 Ranfurly Shield victory over Wellington.

Francis made his All Blacks début in 1905 against Australia and became an automatic selection, playing in a total of ten Test matches in the next five years. In 1910 Francis and teammate George A. Gillett rescued Anglo-Welsh Lions player Percy Down, who had fallen into the sea, keeping him afloat until a rope was lowered from the ship upon which Down was about to return to Great Britain.

Rugby league career
Francis switched codes in 1911 during the season, joining the Auckland Rugby League competition. He played for Newton Rangers and scored a try in his debut game in the code. He represented Auckland and New Zealand in his inaugural season, touring Australia, before being selected to be part of the Australasia side that toured Great Britain at the end of the year. In 1912 he captained New Zealand on his second tour of Australia. However, halfway through the tour, Francis left the touring party to take up a contract with Wigan. Arthur Francis played as a forward, i.e. number 10, in Wigan's 21–5 victory over Rochdale Hornets in the 1912 Lancashire County Cup Final during the 1912–13 season at Weaste, Salford, on Wednesday 11 December 1912. He would go on to play 214 first grade matches for Wigan.

Coaching career
Francis was later reinstated by the New Zealand Rugby Union, and coached rugby union at club level for Grammar RFC in the Auckland Rugby Union competition.

Personal life
Francis was the brother-in-law of The Original All Blacks captain, Dave Gallaher who married his sister, Ellen Ivy May Francis.

References

External links
Statistics at wigan.rlfans.com

1882 births
1957 deaths
Auckland rugby league team players
Auckland rugby union players
Australasia rugby league team players
Dual-code rugby internationals
New Zealand international rugby union players
New Zealand national rugby league team captains
New Zealand national rugby league team players
New Zealand rugby league players
New Zealand rugby union coaches
New Zealand rugby union players
Newton Rangers players
Ponsonby RFC players
Rugby league forwards
Rugby league players from Whanganui
Rugby union locks
Rugby union players from Whanganui
Wigan Warriors players